Fredrik Torp (born 24 May 1937) is a Norwegian architect.

He took his education at the Norwegian Institute of Technology in 1961, and in 1965 he established the company Telje-Torp-Aasen Arkitektkontor together with Are Telje and Knut Aasen. Among their works are the new University Library of Oslo (1999) and the Oslo police headquarters (1978).

References

1937 births
Living people
Architects from Oslo
Norwegian Institute of Technology alumni